Peter Kenneth Newman (5 October 1928, Mitcham, Surrey, England – 6 November 2001, Hamilton, New Zealand) was an English economist and historian of economic thought. He helped to edit The New Palgrave: A Dictionary of Economics, to which he contributed several articles.

Bibliography

Books

Newman, Peter K,;  Englewoods Cliffs N.J./New York, Prentice-Hall. Inc. (1965) The Theory of Exchange:  
Newman, Peter K,;  London, Institute of Race Relations, Oxford University Press (1964) British Guiana  Problems of Cohesion in an Immigrant Society,  ASIN: B0007FQPTI
Newman, Peter K, ;  (ed): Baltimore/London Johns Hopkins University Press (1968)  Readings in Mathematical Economics Vols I & II, ASIN: B00NCPS9WG
Newman, Peter K, ; (ed) Oxford University Press (2003) F.Y. Edgeworth's  Mathematical Psychics and Further Papers on Political Economy,

Selected dictionary contributions

References

External reference
 Obituary by Murray Milgate, The Independent (UK), 30 November 2001

English economists
Historians of economic thought
1928 births
2001 deaths